Malme or Malmefjorden is a village at the end of the Malmefjorden (an arm of the Frænfjorden) in Hustadvika Municipality in Møre og Romsdal county, Norway.

References

Hustadvika (municipality)
Villages in Møre og Romsdal